Darij may refer to:
 Vayrij, Qom Province
 Daraj, South Khorasan Province